Henry Alexander Ruszkowski (November 10, 1925 – May 31, 2000) was an American professional baseball player. A catcher, he appeared in 40 Major League games over parts of three seasons for the Cleveland Indians (1944–1945; 1947). He was born in Cleveland, Ohio.

During his Major League career, Ruszkowski was a .238 hitter (20-for-84) with three home runs, two doubles and a .310 on-base percentage. He also played seven minor league seasons between 1944 and 1954, appearing in 298 games.

Ruszkowski  died in his native Cleveland at the age of 74.

Sources

1925 births
2000 deaths
Baltimore Orioles (IL) players
Baseball players from Ohio
Burlington Flints players
Cleveland Indians players
Columbia Reds players
Dayton Flyers baseball players
Granby Red Sox players
Little Rock Travelers players
Major League Baseball catchers
St. Hyacinthe Saints players
Trois-Rivières Royals players
Wilkes-Barre Barons (baseball) players